Faye is a typical Serer surname - an ethnic group found in Senegal, Gambia and Mauritania. This Serer surname is unrelated to the similar given name in the Western world.  They are also pronounced differently.    

People with the surname Faye include:
 Abdala Faye (born 1971), Senegalese mixed media artist
 Abdoulaye Faye (born 1978), Senegalese footballer
 Alice Faye, stage name of American actress and singer Alice Jeanne Leppert (1915–1998)
 Amdy Faye (born 1977), Senegalese footballer
 Andreas Faye (1802–1869), Norwegian priest, folklorist, and historian
 Fary Faye (born 1974), Senegalese retired footballer
 Fatou Lamin Faye (born 1954), Gambian politician
 Frances Faye (1912–1991), American singer and pianist
 Gaël Faye (born 1982), Rwandan-French singer and writer
 Gaynor Faye (born 1971), English actress and writer
 Guillaume Faye (1949–2019), French journalist and writer
 Hervé Faye (1814–1902) French astronomer
 H. P. Faye (1859–1928), Norwegian-born businessman in the Kingdom of Hawaii
 Ibrahima Faye (born 1979), Senegalese footballer
 Jean-Pierre Faye (born 1925), French philosopher and writer of fiction and prose poetry
 Jørgen Breder Faye (1823–1908), Norwegian banker and politician
 Julia Faye (1892–1966), American actress
 Mouhammad Faye (born 1985), Senegalese basketball player
 Pape Omar Faye (born 1987), Senegalese footballer
 Randall Faye (1892–1948), American screenwriter, film producer and director
 Safi Faye (born 1943), Senegalese film director
 Sheikh Omar Faye (born 1960), Gambian diplomat, former government minister and former athlete

See also
Faye family
Fay (surname)
Faye (disambiguation)

Serer surnames